SS Egypt was a P&O ocean liner. A subsequent salvage operation recovered most of the cargo of gold and silver.

Early career
Caird & Company built  Egypt at Greenock on the River Clyde, launching her in 1897. She generally ran between United Kingdom and India, but also was a hospital ship in the First World War.

Final voyage
Egypt left Tilbury, Essex, on 19 May 1922 carrying only 44 passengers and a cargo that included gold and silver bullion and gold sovereigns worth over £1 million (around £200 million at the 2012 gold price).

The voyage proceeded normally until the early morning of 20 May when fog was encountered. As a safety measure Captain Collyer greatly reduced the speed of the ship. Egypt remained in fog until the afternoon when the navigator was able to sight landmarks on the French coast and fix the ship's position.

After continuing the voyage for several hours a dense fog bank was suddenly encountered at around 7 o'clock. The engines were stopped but almost immediately afterwards a fog whistle was heard. Seine had a strengthened bow for ice-breaking, which penetrated deeply into Egypt′s hull before the ships drifted apart.

An SOS distress signal was transmitted and replies were received from the steamers  and RMS Andes but Egypt sank in less than 20 minutes before either ship arrived. Most of the passengers and crew were able to abandon ship in the lifeboats which were picked up by Seine, but 86 of the 352 people on board Egypt died.

Salvage

Because Egypt had such valuable cargo, it was not long before salvage attempts began. However, the Egypt′s wreck was not found until 1930. Giovanni Quaglia from the Genoese company Società Ricuperi Marittimi (So.Ri.Ma.) was in charge of the operation and decided to use his salvage fleet with the main ship Artiglio in which they were embarked a famous group of expert hard hat divers under the command of the chief diver Alberto Gianni, who was also an inventor of special diving equipment. Thanks to the great skill and inventiveness of the diver chief Alberto Gianni, the point where the ship sank was found and with the use of his specially-built armoured suit, called Torretta Butoscopica, with a diver inside who was able to direct all the salvage operations at that depth, and the placing of explosives to blast through the ship to expose the strong room. The diver then directed a grab which picked up the gold and silver. The salvage continued until 1935 by which time 98% of the contents of the strong room had been recovered.
All the phases of the recovery were reported by the Times reporter David Scott, who sent the cables every day to the newspaper, and who then published two famous books on this adventure, the first very deep recovery by divers, "Seventy Fathom deep, with the divers of salvage ship Artiglio" and "The Egypt's gold" also translated into Italian.

Diving
During June 2001 a team of British technical divers known as the Starfish Enterprise left Plymouth, England aboard the 24m long Royal Navy fleet tender 'Loyal Watcher' in search of the wreck. The research position gave the wreck to be 150 nautical miles across the English Channel and into the Bay of Biscay. They discovered and positively identified the wreck laying 25 miles off the French island of Ushant, a place noted for those famous images of treacherous seas totally engulfing cliff top lighthouses. 
The divers had conducted their exploration mainly on the upright bow of the wreck but noted that the remaining sections although upright had considerably broken down to seabed level. Each of the divers recorded a maximum depth of 127 meters (420 ft). Deep wreck photographer Leigh Bishop was able to photograph sections of the bellied hull suspended upright, a spare prop on the forward deck, porcelain marked with the P&O  and numerous portholes with drip trays and square fastening dogs, a trademark of P&O liners.

References

Sources

External links
 - "SS Egypt" ship loss history

 – illustrated description of the salvage of Egypt
 – diving exploration of shipwreck Egypt

1897 ships
Ships built on the River Clyde
Hospital ships in World War I
Maritime incidents in 1922
Merchant ships of the United Kingdom
Passenger ships of the United Kingdom
Ships of P&O (company)
Ships sunk in collisions
World War I merchant ships of the United Kingdom
Shipwrecks in the Celtic Sea